Yevgeny Pervyshov (born May 4, 1976, Krasnodar) is a Russian political figure and a deputy of the 8th State Duma. 

From 2005 to 2010, Pervyshov was a deputy of the City Duma of Krasnodar of the 4th convocation. In 2006, he joined the A Just Russia — For Truth. In 2010-2012, he was the deputy of the City Duma of Krasnodar of the 5th convocation. In 2012, he joined the Rodina party, but the next year he moved to the United Russia. On October 8, 2016, he was appointed the  mayor of Krasnodar. He left the post in September 2021 to become deputy of the 8th State Duma.

References

1976 births
Living people
United Russia politicians
21st-century Russian politicians
Eighth convocation members of the State Duma (Russian Federation)
Mayors of places in Russia
People from Krasnodar